Craine is a Manx surname. Notable people with the surname include:

Anne Craine (born 1954), former Minister for the Treasury for the Isle of Man
Peter Craine (19??–2003), Manx politician
John W. Craine Jr., retired United States Navy vice admiral
Walter C. Craine (1877–1961), Manx politician and trade unionist

Surnames of Manx origin
Manx-language surnames